Law enforcement in Georgia is conducted by the Ministry of Internal Affairs of Georgia. Currently, there are more than 42,000 registered police officers.

History

The Georgian police introduced an 022 emergency dispatch service in 2004. As of 2017 you can contact Georgian police with a 112 Emergency Dispatch.

Vehicles
Škoda Octavia
Škoda Rapid
Mitsubishi Outlander
Toyota Hilux
Toyota Corolla
Mitsubishi L200
Mitsubishi Colt
Ford Police Interceptor Sedan
Ford Police Interceptor Utility
Honda Insight
Hyundai Ioniq
Hyundai Getz
Hyundai H-1
BMW E60 M5
BMW F10 M5

Weapons
Yavuz 16

Restructuring
In the mid-2000s the Patrol Police Department of the Ministry of Internal Affairs of Georgia underwent a radical transformation. In 2005 Georgian President Mikheil Saakashvili fired "the entire traffic police force" of the Georgian National Police due to corruption, numbering around 30,000 police officers.

A new force was built around new recruits. The United States State Department's Bureau of International Narcotics and Law-Enforcement Affairs has provided assistance to the training efforts. Patruli was first introduced in the summer of 2005 replacing the traffic police, which were accused of corruption.

Throughout the reformation, policemen were presented with new Volkswagen cars and navy blue uniforms, with "Police" written on the back. They were armed with Israeli Jericho-941SFL pistols instead of PMs.

The Georgian Immigration Enforcement Training Video Unit (GIETVU) works to improve training methods for immigration enforcement operatives.

In 2009 the U.S. State Department launched U.S. State Department’s International Narcotics and Law Enforcement Program "The Georgia-to-Georgia Exchange Program", providing Georgian policemen with education courses in the State of Georgia. On June the United States funded 20 million dollars on these courses.

References

External links 

 Police.ge. The Ministry of Internal Affairs of Georgia. Official Website.

 
Law of Georgia (country)